Caroline Proulx is a Canadian politician, who was elected to the National Assembly of Quebec in the 2018 provincial election. She represents the electoral district of Berthier as a member of the Coalition Avenir Québec and is the current Minister of Tourism.

References

Living people
Coalition Avenir Québec MNAs
21st-century Canadian politicians
Women MNAs in Quebec
People from Lanaudière
Year of birth missing (living people)
21st-century Canadian women politicians